City Clinical Hospital No. 40 is a major hospital serving Moscow and the region surrounding it.

History
The history of the hospital dates back to 1898, when at a meeting of the Moscow District Zemstvo, Dr. Evgeny Fedorovich Pecherkin was instructed to organize the Rostokino Zemstvo Hospital. The territory designated for the hospital was a wasteland.

The hospital complex began with 4 peasant huts, which housed an outpatient clinic with a pharmacy, an emergency room for 3-4 beds and rooms for paramedical and obstetrical personnel and families. Medical assistance was provided to the population of the surrounding villages, factory workers.

By 1899, a wooden house was built, which began to function as a hospital with surgical, therapeutic and maternity beds. Separately, a barrack was built for "contagious" patients and apartments for staff. The hospital had a total of 40 beds. The hospital and outpatient clinic served twenty-five thousand people in the villages of Alekseevsky, Rostokino, Medvedkovo, Leonovo, Sviblovo, Ostankino and Mokhovo near Moscow.

In 2019 the hospital expanded significantly with the addition of a new complex in Kommunarka district in southern Moscow called Novomoskovskoye (. Since the breakout of the COVID-19 pandemic in Russia, the Kommunarka complex became one of the largest treatment centers for infected people, with president Putin visiting the hospital.

See also
 Healthcare in Russia

References

Buildings and structures in Moscow
Hospitals in Russia